The Evangelical Presbyterian University College was established in 2008 by the Evangelical Presbyterian Church, Ghana.

Campuses
There are two campuses. The first is the Central Municipal Campus located at Ho, capital of the Volta Region  of Ghana. The other is the Greenhill Campus, located at Peki in the South Dayi District of the Volta Region.

Programmes
It currently has programmes organised by the School of Business and the School of Theology.

 B.SC Business Administration (Credit Management & Finance)
BA Social and Community Development Studies
B.Sc Business Administration (Marketing)
BSc. Integrated Development Studies
BSc Business Administration (HR)
BA (Hons) Pastoral Ministry and Church Management
BA Corporate Secretaryship and Management
B. Sc. Agribusiness
BSc. (Hons) Business Administration (Accounting and Finance)
B.SC. Animal Science And Fisheries
B.Sc. Crop And Soil Sciences
B. ED. (Arts)
B. ED. Basic Education
B.A. English

References

External links
Official Website
Evangelical Presbyterian University College on National Accreditation Board website
Global ministries

Christian universities and colleges in Ghana
Educational institutions established in 2008
2008 establishments in Ghana
Education in Volta Region